Bodai Dam is a gravity dam located in Chiba Prefecture in Japan. The dam is used for irrigation and water supply. The catchment area of the dam is 6.7 km2. The dam impounds about 25  ha of land when full and can store 2740 thousand cubic meters of water. The construction of the dam was started on 1983 and completed in 1998.

References

Dams in Chiba Prefecture
1998 establishments in Japan